Tumkur, officially renamed as Tumakuru, is a city located in the southern part of Indian state of Karnataka. It is the headquarters of the Tumkur district. It is located at an altitude of 835 m (2739.5 ft).

Tumkur hosts India's first mega food park, a project of the ministry of food processing. The India Food Park was inaugurated by Prime Minister Narendra Modi in September 2014. Tumkur is also included in the Smart Cities Mission list and is among the 100 smart cities to be developed in India. Since 28 August 2010, Tumkur has been accorded the status of a city corporation.

Etymology
Etymologically, the name of the city is believed to have been mutated possibly from "Tumbe ooru" because of the abundance of thumbe hoovu, a kind of flower, or thamate ooru because of the folk musical percussion instrument thamate, that might have been used most here. It is also called Kalpatharu Nadu (land of coconut trees), due to the abundance of coconut trees in the area.

Another story says that during the rule of cholas Gulur was their capital. Since Tumkur is at high elevation the guards used to be there on any hill with tumaki (a kind of drum) and used to make sound in case of any alerts, hence the name. The Indian central government approved the request to officially rename the Tumkur and 12 other cities in October 2014. The city officially became "Tumakuru" on 1 November 2014.

Geography
Tumkur is a city located in the southern state of Karnataka, India. It is situated at an altitude of around 800 meters above sea level and is located about 70 kilometers northwest of the state capital, Bengaluru.

The city is situated on the Deccan Plateau, which is a large plateau that covers a significant part of southern India. The region is characterized by a tropical savannah climate, with hot summers and mild winters. The average temperature in Tumkur ranges from around 25 degrees Celsius in the summers to around 15 degrees Celsius in the winters. The city receives an average annual rainfall of around 750 millimeters.

The city is surrounded by low hills and rocky outcrops, which are a part of the Eastern Ghats mountain range. The Tumkur district, of which Tumkur city is the administrative center, is known for its rich natural resources, including minerals like granite and iron ore.

The city is situated on the banks of the Shimsha River, which is a tributary of the Jayamangali River. The river provides water for irrigation and is also used for industrial and domestic purposes. The city has a number of lakes, such as the Honnamana Kere and the Gubbi Kere, which are popular among locals for recreational activities like boating and fishing.

In conclusion, Tumkur is a city located in southern India, on the Deccan Plateau. The city is situated at an altitude of around 800 meters above sea level, and is characterized by a tropical savannah climate, low hills and rocky outcrops and surrounded by Eastern Ghats mountain range. The city is situated on the banks of the Shimsha River and has a number of lakes that are popular among locals for recreational activities.

Demographics
As of 2011 India census, Tumkur is a city located in the southern state of Karnataka, India. According to the 2011 Census of India, the population of Tumkur was approximately 542,000. The city has a population density of 3,100 people per square kilometer. The majority of the population belongs to the Hindu religion, with a small minority of Muslims and Christians.

The official language spoken in Tumkur is Kannada, however, many people also speak Hindi, English, and Telugu. The literacy rate in Tumkur is around 78%, which is higher than the national average. The city has a number of educational institutions, including engineering colleges, medical colleges, and universities.

The majority of the population in Tumkur is engaged in agriculture and related activities, with a significant proportion also working in the industrial sector. The city is known for its production of silk and cotton, as well as its milk and milk products.

Tumkur is a diverse city with a mix of different cultural and ethnic groups. The city has a good balance of different age groups and gender. The city has a young population with around 30% of the population is less than 15 years old.

In conclusion, Tumkur is a city with a population of around 542,000 people. The majority of the population belongs to the Hindu religion, and the official language spoken is Kannada. The city has a high literacy rate and a diverse population engaged in agriculture and industry. The city also has a young population, with a large proportion of the population being under the age of 15.

History
Tumkur is a city in the southern state of Karnataka, India. It has a long history that dates back to the pre-historic era. The region was known for its rich cultural heritage and was a major center for trade and commerce in ancient times. The city was ruled by various dynasties over the centuries, including the Kadambas, the Gangas, the Cholas, and the Hoysalas. In the 16th century, Tumkur came under the rule of the Vijayanagara Empire, and later, the Wodeyars of Mysore. During the British colonial period, Tumkur was a major center for cotton and silk production. After India gained independence in 1947, Tumkur became a district in the state of Mysore (later renamed as Karnataka). Today, Tumkur is a rapidly developing city, known for its industrial and agricultural production, as well as its educational and cultural institutions.

In the 19th century, Tumkur was a major center for the textile industry, with cotton and silk mills being set up in the city. The British East India Company also established a cotton press in Tumkur, which led to an increase in agricultural production in the region. During this time, Tumkur also saw a growth in its transportation infrastructure, with the construction of a railway line connecting the city to other major cities in the state.

In the 20th century, Tumkur continued to be an important center for industry and agriculture. The city saw a rise in the production of silk, with the establishment of the Tumkur Silk Society in the 1940s. The city also saw a growth in the production of milk and milk products, with the establishment of the Tumkur Milk Union in the 1960s. In the 1970s and 1980s, Tumkur saw a rise in the number of small-scale industries, particularly in the fields of engineering and manufacturing.

Today, Tumkur is a rapidly developing city, with a growing population and a strong economy. It is known for its industrial and agricultural production, as well as its educational and cultural institutions. Tumkur has a number of educational institutions, including engineering colleges, medical colleges, and universities. The city is also home to a number of cultural and historical landmarks, including the Sri Gavi Gangadhareshwara Temple, the Sri Siddaganga Matha, and the Tumkur Fort.

Climate

Transportation
Karnataka State Road Transport Corporation, KSRTC, has a divisional office situated in Tumkur City. The city is well-connected to Bangalore and other cities in the state by KSRTC buses.  Volvo buses are available for the city, Bangalore. Frequent buses are available connecting other taluks and towns of the district. Three National Highways NH 48, NH 73 and NH 69 pass through the city. The three National Highways connect Tumkur to Hubli, Mangalore and Shimoga in Karnataka respectively. TCB Road(Karnataka)(Tumkur-Chelur-Bukkapatna Road) connects the people of Hagalavadi, Chelur and Bellavi Towns to Tumkur Corporation City.  Plenty of private and Karnataka State Road Transport Corporation buses are currently operating on this route.

Railways also play a major role in connectivity. The city's Railway Station comes under South Western Railway Zone (India) and was constructed during the British period and has been renovated recently. It is located in centre of the city close to the bus stand and the town hall. It is located in the Bangalore-Hubli main line.

The city buses are also available for transportation within the city by KSRTC. Popularly known as Sri Siddaganga Nagara Sarige, named after the holy place, Siddaganga. There are more than 100 buses transporting in the city.

The nearest airport to Tumkur is Kempegowda International Airport in Bangalore which is around 90 km from the city.

Economy

Tumkur district's economy is majorly derived from agriculture. Plantation crops such as coconut, areca nut, paddy cultivation (some parts) attributes to its economy.
Tumkur City's economy comes from industries.

Due to its proximity to Bangalore, the state capital, it acts as a gateway to North Karnataka, being on the Chennai – Mumbai industrial corridor and the infrastructure that Tumkur provides, it has the potential to be the satellite city to decongest the Bangalore. It also has been identified as National Investment and Manufacturing Zone (NIMZ). NIMZ of approximately 13500 acres and the HAL helicopter manufacturing facility (Near Gubbi) 610 acres are being developed as integrated industrial townships with state-of-the art infrastructure and land use on the basis of zoning, clean and energy efficient technology, necessary social infrastructure, and skill development facilities, for promoting world class manufacturing activity. Tumkur is home to 24 large scale industries with an investment of 911.42 crores and generating an employment for 6445 persons. The existing 15 medium scale industries and 23804 micro and small industries employ 132994 persons and account for an investment of close to 790 crores. A 2000 MW of solar power plant on 11000 acres is being developed near Pavagada to cater to the power needs of Tumkur and adjoining districts.

Educational institutes
Siddaganga Institute of Technology
Tumkur University

Tumkur is famous for Siddaganga Matha 5 km toward HITECH city flyover, known for providing free education and dorms for more than 9000 children. Karnataka Rathna Shivakumara Swami, was the president of this matha.

Notable people

Actors
 
 

Arjun Sarja, actor
Jaggesh, actor
Sharath Lohitashwa, actor
Lohithaswa T. S., actor, writer
Manjula, actress
Narasimharaju
Siddhanth, actor
Ashika Ranganath, actress
 Rangayana Raghu, Actor and Comedian

Arts
 
 

Doddarange Gowda, poet
Amarashilpi Jakanachari, sculptor
Renuka Kesaramadu, painter and sculptor
Kunigal Nagabhushan, writer
T. Sunandamma, writer and humorist
B. M. Srikantaiah, writer known as Kannadada Kanva
T. N. Srikantaiah, poet, linguist and teacher
Chi. Udayashankar, lyricist
Gubbi Veeranna, theatre director
Chandrika Gururaj - playback singer

Politicians
 
 
G. S. Basavaraj, politician 
K. Lakkappa, politician
S. Mallikarjunaiah, politician
Rank Nazeer Ahmed, politician
G. Parameshwara, former Deputy Chief Minister of Karnataka, former KPCC President

Sports
 
 
Poll Ashokanand, cricketer
Poll Shyamsunder, cricketer

Others
 
 
C. P. Sadashivaiah, Indian freedom fighter
Shivakumara Swami, supercentenarian, humanitarian, spiritual leader and educator
Saalumarada Thimmakka, Indian environmentalist

Media
Tumkur has a private FM radio channel, Siddhartha, situated at SSIT campus, broadcasting in Kannada language. Amogha local channel is Amogha Networks.

See also
 Ajjappanahalli, Tumkur
 Bajagur
 Narasimha Swamy Temple, Seebi

References

External links 
 Official website of Tumkur Urban Development Authority

 
Cities and towns in Tumkur district
Cities in Karnataka